KZAL (94.7 FM) is a radio station broadcasting a country music format. Licensed to Manson, Washington, United States, the station serves the Lake Chelan and Greater Wenatchee area.  KZAL is known as Z-Country 94.7.   Z-Country features Big D & Bubba in the morning and David Mars afternoons.   Z-Country 94.7 is "Your Hometown Country."    The station is currently owned by Chelan Valley Media Group, LLC.

References

External links

ZAL
Country radio stations in the United States